Vinni Lettieri (born February 6, 1995) is an American professional ice hockey center for the Providence Bruins of the American Hockey League (AHL) while under contract to the Boston Bruins of the National Hockey League (NHL).

Playing career
After playing two seasons with the Lincoln Stars in the USHL, Lettieri committed to the University of Minnesota. He played for the Minnesota Golden Gophers for four seasons and helped them win the Big Ten regular season title in four straight seasons.

On March 27, 2017, Lettieri signed a two-year entry-level contract as a free agent with the New York Rangers of the National Hockey League (NHL). He was invited to the Rangers training camp before the 2017–18 season but was cut and sent to the Hartford Wolf Pack before the final roster was made. On December 29, 2017, Lettieri made his NHL debut in a 3–2 loss to the Detroit Red Wings, in which he scored his first NHL goal. He was recalled multiple times in January and February before finally being assigned back to the AHL on February 26 after playing in a total of 19 NHL games that season.

Lettieri spent the 2018–19 season rotating between the NHL and AHL getting called up for longer stints in the second half of the season. He finished the season with one goal and two assists. His lone goal came on a one-timer shot on March 25, 2019, against the Pittsburgh Penguins for his first career goal at Madison Square Garden.

After four seasons within the Rangers organization, Lettieri left as a free agent and signed a one-year, two-way contract with the Anaheim Ducks on October 10, 2020. On July 13, 2021, Lettieri was signed to a one-year, two-way contract extension by the Ducks.

On July 13, 2022, Lettieri was signed to a one-year, two-way contract by the Boston Bruins.

After impressive play for the Bruins AHL affiliate, the Providence Bruins, Lettieri was called up to the NHL squad on January 26, 2023. However, he suffered an injury just one day later, causing him to be placed on IR. Once healed, Lettieri was then placed on waivers without having played a game for the Bruins, where he cleared.

Personal life
Lettieri's grandfather, Lou Nanne, played, coached and was the general manager of the Minnesota North Stars. His father, Tino, played professional soccer, while his uncle Marty Nanne was drafted 161st overall by the Chicago Blackhawks in the 1986 NHL Entry Draft and played in the International Hockey League (IHL) for three seasons. His cousins are also ice hockey players – Tyler Nanne was drafted 142nd overall by the New York Rangers in the 2014 NHL Entry Draft, while Louis Nanne was drafted 188th overall by the Minnesota Wild in the 2012 NHL Entry Draft.

Career statistics

Regular season and playoffs

International

Awards and honors

References

External links
 

1995 births
Living people
American men's ice hockey centers
American people of Italian descent
Anaheim Ducks players
Hartford Wolf Pack players
Ice hockey players from Minnesota
Lincoln Stars players
Minnesota Golden Gophers men's ice hockey players
New York Rangers players
People from Excelsior, Minnesota
Providence Bruins players
San Diego Gulls (AHL) players
Undrafted National Hockey League players
USA Hockey National Team Development Program players